Soup2Nuts (sometimes referred to as Soup2Nuts Studios, and formerly part of Tom Snyder Productions) was an American animation studio founded by Tom Snyder. The studio is known for its animated comedy series, its use of Squigglevision, a technique of animation that reuses frames to make the animation look more kinetic, and for its style of improvisation in voice acting.

History 
Tom Snyder, a teacher at Shady Hill School, began designing computer programs in the 1970s to enhance his 4th to 8th grade classes' learning environments. In 1980, Jere Dykema, the parent of one of Snyder's Shady Hill students, gave Snyder $30,000 to establish Computer Learning Connection (later renamed Tom Snyder Productions) for a 30% equity stake. Dykema also loaned CLC $100,000, which they paid back.

Tom Snyder Productions created and produced its first TV show, Dr. Katz, Professional Therapist in 1995 for Comedy Central. On February 23, 1996, the company announced it would be acquired by Torstar Corporation for more than $10 million. Torstar would provide Tom Snyder with additional cash to expand its education and television operations.  Later, the company created and produced Home Movies which aired originally on UPN, but after cancellation, continued on Adult Swim.  In 2001, Snyder's television division was renamed Soup2Nuts, named after the company's involvement in the production of programs from beginning to end. Soup2Nuts also produced shorts, book adaptations, commercials, and interactive online series. Tom Snyder Productions and Soup2Nuts were purchased by Scholastic Corporation on December 21, 2001. Tom Synder Productions continued to develop educational products under Scholastic until 2015.

Soup2Nuts began work on WordGirl, a superhero educational show for PBS Kids, in 2007. It had won numerous national awards including Best Direction for an Animated Children's Program and Outstanding Writing in Animation.

On March 13, 2015, Scholastic Inc. announced they were closing the studio. According to Kyle Good, the senior vice president of corporate communications for Scholastic, the decision was made to shut down Soup2Nuts as part of an overall restructuring of the parent company. Good commented, "We are restructuring that part of the business closer to our core businesses which are children's publishing and education. We have other options to continue television programming." Scholastic had cut the number of employees to just nine people earlier in 2015.

Astroblast! was Soup2Nuts' final production. Scholastic closed Tom Snyder Productions on December 31, 2015; the company's FASTT Math product was acquired by Houghton Mifflin Harcourt.

Productions

Video games
Personk (1978)
The Search Series (1980)
Snooper Troops: Case #1: The Granite Point Ghost (1982)
Snooper Troops: Case #2: The Case of the Disappearing Dolphin (1982)
In Search of the Most Amazing Thing (1983)
Agent USA (1984)
American Challenge: A Sailing Simulation (1986)
Sub Mission (1986)
Gamma Force in Pit of a Thousand Screams (1988)
Lane Mastodon vs. the Blubbermen (1988)
Decisions, Decisions (1988)
ZorkQuest: Assault on Egreth Castle (1988)
ZorkQuest: The Crystal of Doom (1989)
Fizz & Martina (1992)
Math Mysteries (2000)
Science Seekers (2000)

Animation

References

External links
 Official website
 

1980 establishments in Massachusetts
2015 disestablishments in Massachusetts
American animation studios
American companies disestablished in 2015
American companies established in 1980
Defunct companies based in Massachusetts
Defunct film and television production companies of the United States
Entertainment companies based in Massachusetts
Mass media companies disestablished in 2015
Mass media companies established in 1980
Scholastic Corporation
Squigglevision